Bastacola is a neighbourhood in Dhanbad in Dhanbad Sadar subdivision of Dhanbad district in the Indian state of Jharkhand.

Geography
Bastacola was combined with other urban units to form Dhanbad Municipal Corporation in 2006. Bastacola is part of Ward No. 34 of Dhanbad Municipal Corporation.

It is located 8 km east of Dhanbad railway station.

Economy
The Bastacola Area of BCCL is amalgamation of thirty-three private collieries of the pre-nationalisation era. After reorganisation, the Area has 4 underground mines - Bastacola, Bera, Dobari and Kuya, 2 departmentally operated open cast mines – Bastacola OCP, Bera OCP and one out-sourced OCP – Kujama OCP. Kujama colliery is closed since 1995 because of underground fire. Ghanoodih OCP is affected by surface fire.

Healthcare
Bastacola Area has a 50-bedded Regional Hospital at Tisra, and dispensaries/ mini-dispensaries at Ghanoodih, Bera, Duburi, Kuya, Bastacola, Kujama.

References

Neighbourhoods in Dhanbad